The Jewish Community Center of UAE is a community led by the Chabad Rabbi Levi Duchman and community president Solly Wolf.

History 
Since the formation of the United Arab Emirates (UAE) in 1971, a small Jewish community grew and lived in the UAE for many years, but was mostly living in the shadows. Recently, as improved relations between Israel and the UAE, Jews in the UAE started coming out of the shadows and openly praying including for the welfare of the Emirates government and its armed forces. In June 2020, a message of love for the Jewish community in Dubai, Solly Wolf, and the rulers of the Emirates from the famous Israeli singer Omer Adam was publicized through the official Twitter account in Arabic for the State of Israel.

Synagogue 
The JCC (Jewish Community Center) of the UAE, is led by Chabad Rabbi Levi Duchman. A Jewish benediction is recited to the president of the UAE Sheikh Khalifa bin Zayed al Nahyan as well as to the rest of the rulers of the UAE during Shabbat.

Kosher food 
The supply of 1,000 kosher chickens per week is provided to the community by local Kosher Shechita.  In May 2020, it was reported that the JCC of UAE has imported the largest meat shipment in the history of the community.

Following the normalization agreement, Duchman opened an upscale kosher restaurant in the Burj Khalifa tower in Dubai, serving Mediterranean fare and wine and sporting a "sleek Asian decor".

Talmud Torah School 
A new Talmud Torah was reported in 2020 to have been recently established and now has around 40 pupils.

Public sukkah
For the Sukkot holiday in October 2020, Duchman erected a public sukkah next to the Burj Khalifa tower in Dubai.

See also 
History of the Jews in the United Arab Emirates

References

External links 
 Official Twitter Account of the JCC of the UAE
Jewish UAE Website

Chabad in Asia
Chabad organizations
United Arab Emirates
Jewish
Jews and Judaism in the United Arab Emirates
United Arab Emirates
United Arab Emirates
Hasidic synagogues
Orthodox Judaism in the Arab world
Orthodox Judaism in the Middle East
Synagogues in the Middle East